Kimnyaki is an administrative ward in the Arusha Rural District of the Arusha Region of Tanzania. The name "Kimnyaki" means we are lucky in Maasai.  According to the 2012 census, the ward has a total population of 3,487.

References

Wards of Arusha District
Wards of Arusha Region